Killeter is a small village and townland near Castlederg in County Tyrone, Northern Ireland. In the 2001 Census it had a population of 147.

Killeter has a yearly August fair, which celebrates the diversity and richness of rural life. The village itself sits along an ancient pilgrimage trail which winds its way to Lough Derg. The national cycle network traverses part of this trail, which is bounded to the west by Killeter Forest.

The writer Benedict Kiely has stated that he based the fictional village of Carmincross, in his novel Nothing Happens in Carmincross, on Killeter.

History
Killeter, plus the rural protrusion of Tyrone to its immediate west, would have been transferred to the Irish Free State had the recommendations of the Irish Boundary Commission been enacted in 1925.

Places of interest 
Near Killeter is the Magherakeel historical site with a holy well, lime kiln and ruins of an early church.

Meteorites 
On 29 April 1844, a shower of Meteoric Stones fell, in the sight of several people, at Killeter; they were broken into small fragments and only one piece was found whole.

References 

Villages in County Tyrone
1844 in Ireland
Meteorite falls
Meteorites found in the United Kingdom